Hugh Green may refer to:

 Hugh Green (martyr) (1584–1642), English Catholic priest and martyr
 Hugh Green (politician) (1887–1968), American politician, member of the Illinois House of Representatives
 Hughie Green (1920–1997), British television presenter
 Hugh Green (American football) (born 1959), former American football linebacker in the National Football League

See also
 Sir Hugh Greene (1910–1987), British journalist and director-general of the BBC, 1960–1969